Monroe Township is one of fourteen townships in Madison County, Indiana, United States. In the 2010 census, its population was 8,786 and it contained 4,098 housing units.

History
Monroe Township was organized in 1836. It was named for President James Monroe.

Geography

Cities, towns, villages
 Alexandria
 Orestes

Unincorporated towns
 Gehring and Gumz Ditch at 
 Gimco City at 
 Innisdale at 
(This list is based on USGS data and may include former settlements.)

Cemeteries
The township contains these six cemeteries: Bell, Donahue, Parkview, Pisgah, Star and Walker.

Major highways
  Indiana State Road 9
  Indiana State Road 28

Airports and landing strips
 Alexandria Airport

Education
 Alexandria Community School Corporation

Monroe Township residents may obtain a free library card from the Alexandria-Monroe Public Library in Alexandria.

Political districts
 Indiana's 6th congressional district
 State House District 35
 State House District 36
 State Senate District 25

References
 
 United States Census Bureau 2008 TIGER/Line Shapefiles
 IndianaMap

External links
 Indiana Township Association
 United Township Association of Indiana
 City-Data.com page for Monroe Township
 Monroe Township history

Townships in Madison County, Indiana
Townships in Indiana